LWJ may refer to:

 FDD's Long War Journal, an American news website which reports on the War on terror
 LWJ, the station code for Lowjee railway station, Maharashtra, India